Lorenzo is an unincorporated community and census-designated place in Cheyenne County, Nebraska, United States.< As of the 2010 census, it had a population of 58.

Demographics

History
Lorenzo was a depot on the Chicago, Burlington and Quincy Railroad. A post office was established at Lorenzo in 1916, and remained in operation until it was discontinued in 1933.

References

Census-designated places in Cheyenne County, Nebraska
Census-designated places in Nebraska